You Gotta Say Yes to Another Excess is the third studio album by Swiss electronic band Yello, released in June 1983. It was the last Yello album to feature founding member Carlos Perón. It charted in several countries across Europe, and also peaked at No. 184 on the U.S. Billboard 200.

Track listing

Charts
Singles - UK Singles Chart / Gallup (United Kingdom)

Critical reception 
It was ranked at number 6 among the "Albums of the Year" for 1983 by NME, and the single "I Love You" was ranked at number 17 among "Tracks of the Year".

Other 
In 2006, South African ceramicist Elton Harding translated the opening track "I Love You" into a ceramic tactile sculpture. The entire song was mapped out onto a rectangular spiral, with each second of the track taking up 1 cm. Samples were then represented by unique shapes allowing for the song to be 'read' either by sight or touch.

References

External links

Yello albums
1983 albums
Vertigo Records albums
Mercury Records albums
Elektra Records albums
Stiff Records albums
Polydor Records albums